The Millstone Historic District is a historic district located in Millstone, Somerset County, New Jersey. The district was added to the National Register of Historic Places on September 13, 1976 for its significance in education, military history, settlement, and transportation. It includes 58 contributing buildings.

Significant contributing properties

See also
 National Register of Historic Places listings in Somerset County, New Jersey
 List of the oldest buildings in New Jersey

References

External links 

 
 
 Millstone Borough Master Plan Assessment (PDF)

National Register of Historic Places in Somerset County, New Jersey
Federal architecture in New Jersey
Georgian architecture in New Jersey
Buildings and structures completed in 1777
Historic districts on the National Register of Historic Places in New Jersey
Millstone, New Jersey
New Jersey Register of Historic Places
Historic American Buildings Survey in New Jersey